Khurram Waqar (Urdu:خرّم وقار) is a multi-award-winning guitarist/producer from Pakistan who also directs and produces his own music videos. He has been part of various rock outfits for the last 2 decades with varying degree of commercial success. Currently, he is a part of multiple projects, from his international collaboration with 'Brothers in Arms' to the 'Guitar Collective' initiative to his award-winning band, 'kW and the Facedown Movement' (kW & FDM) and guitar instrumentals, video logs, Facebook live jams and collaboration with various internationally renowned musicians. Earlier in 2019, 'kW & FDM' won rock song of the year for 'Todi, the Smoker' at the annual Video Music Awards (VIMA) beating bands from countries such as India, Philippines, Singapore, Malaysia and Thailand.
Previously, as part of the rock outfit Qayaas, he won Best Rock Band (Pakistan) at the Rolling Stones/Jack Daniels Annual Music Awards in 2010 and also won big at the IndieGO awards held in Malaysia in 2012.

Personal life 
Born into a Punjabi Jutt family, Khurram grew up in Lahore, Pindi and Islamabad. His father is a retired bureaucrat and his mother is a housewife. He has a younger brother and a sister. While appreciative of the arts in general, no one else from his family has yet ventured into the field of music.

His parents were supportive of his passion under the condition that he pursue his studies and career in parallel. Khurram did exactly that, graduating from Carnegie Mellon University (CMU), Pittsburgh, PA, USA with a Masters in Information Systems Management.

Since 2002, he has managed a full-time IT/telecom career (currently works at Afiniti as Director IT) along with his musical ventures.

He has two sons and a daughter.

Musical influences
As a school boy, Khurram picked up the guitar due to the magic woven by the music of Guns N' Roses and Slash's guitar skills in particular. This was well before the Internet era and rock music did not have many takers in Pakistan. Inspired by his guitar idols Joe Satriani and Steve Vai, Khurram's undertook an entirely self taught journey towards the realisation of his musical goals. Initially he was predominantly influenced by Western rock and roll, being an avid fan of Led Zeppelin, Van Halen, Whitesnake, Alice in Chains and Soundgarden in particular. Over the years, however, he has absorbed a wide range of influences including Indian classical and semi classical music. This has imparted his musical repertoire with versatility and resulted in a sound that is not mere 'fusion' but a collaborative collage of different musical cultures.

Current ventures

Brothers in Arms (2021-present) 
Brothers in Arms is the world's first India-Pakistan-USA-based rock band, consisting of 3 award winning artists namely,

 Khurram Waqar (kW) (Pakistan)– Guitars/Production
 Prateek Bhaduri (India) – Vocals
 Greg Ellis (USA)– Drums/Percussions

They have collaborated online from their respective countries amidst the COVID-19 pandemic for the love of music and the belief that love exists among us all and music transcends all boundaries and geographies created. The world needs some peace, love and harmony more than ever.

Their first debut single, "Khuda Kay Bandey" "خدا کے بندے" was released on July 14th, 2022. The song talks about the impact of war on humanity and the importance of uniting Mankind as one. Live and Let Love Live.

Guitar Collective (2021-present) 
During the COVID-19 pandemic, Khurram launched an initiative, Guitar Collective, to get all the major guitar players from India, Pakistan, Bangladesh, Nepal and Dubai on one platform for live online discussions on guitars, technique and theory. This group created an opportunity to combine experience, knowledge and bring expertise to the forefront for anyone who is interested, ranging from upcoming musicians to bands to music producers to listeners. The goal is to establish an online collaborative environment to engage, facilitate and encourage independent musicians and raise awareness of the general masses to diversity in music. This is a DIY effort to promote positivity and instill motivation during the challenges created due to the COVID-19 pandemic.

This group schedules regular online live sessions on Instagram and Facebook and has an active YouTube page. Live sessions will be a combination of talks and performances, and have been built upon as the group has progressed. Since the moderators are primarily guitar players and producers, the group focuses on subjects ranging from our guitar playing styles, individual approaches to music, songwriting, and upcoming projects. Since music is a universal language above race, color and creed, this platform/environment will not be limited to one country or region, and is intended to bring in musicians from all over the world. The aim of this group is to provide a new perspective and approach in terms of treating art as a means of self-expression rather than a route to success. Currently the group has 135 guitar players which regularly post on the Guitar Collective Facebook Group, which has 4400 members.

kW (2018-present)
While he has actively been part of various rock outfits since 1992, Khurram has also dabbled in solo guitar instrumentals in parallel, that has, over the years, resulted in a considerable body of work. A few instrumentals were released sporadically but the vast majority of these instrumentals lay unfinished. In 2018, however, Khurram retrieved all the material from the vaults and subjected it to the painstaking process of production, mixing and mastering. The result, thereof, is an instrumental album which is ready for release in the latter half of 2019.

The first instrumental from the upcoming (yet unnamed) album I'll be with you was released in December 2018. It was an entirely independent initiative, every aspect of which was helmed by Khurram from the songwriting and music production to the hitherto untested waters of video direction, editing and production. In Khurram's own words 'This is a guitar instrumental and the idea originated almost 14 years ago when my eldest son was born. Now, this is for my three kids . They have been a part of the journey of the idea from inception to finish line. This is a completely independent initiative and I am very fortunate to have the opportunity to do it on my own'

"Stick Together", the second instrumental was released during the Cricket World Cup 2019 to support the Pakistani cricket team in their quest for the top cricketing honour. Like "I'll be with you" before it, "Stick Together" was also entirely a one-man show. As Khurram puts it:

"This is my instrumental for the love of Cricket and the ongoing Cricket World Cup with well wishes to our unpredictable and talented team. To me, the process of doing everything on my own is not only personally satisfying but also therapeutic."

kW and the Facedown Movement (2014-present)
kW and the Facedown Movement (kW & FDM) is a rock band founded in 2014 with Khurram yet again donning the multiple hats of guitarist, songwriter and producer, accompanied by good friends Solomon and Kami on the vocals and drums respectively.
The band's rather unusual name refers to the members' complete belief in themselves, immersed heart and soul, or literally face down, into their art; original, off beat and totally independent.
The band's off beat approach and the music generated as a result thereof was validated when their song 'Todi, the Smoker' won 'Rock Song of the Year' at the annual Video Music Awards (VIMA) 2019, beating bands from countries such as India, Philippines, Singapore, Malaysia and Thailand.

In June 2019, the band released their debut EP called Facedown. It features the following original numbers:

 "Facedown"
 "Painted Grey"
 "Into The Light"
 "Bend It"
 "Time"
 "Todi, the Smoker"

Of these, videos were released for the singles "Bend It", "Time" and "Todi the Smoker".

The EP had another major distinction to its credit. It was the first time a Pakistani band had had its music mastered by the internationally renowned music producers Ryan Smith and Ted Jensen of Sterling Studio, New York City.

Currently the band is working on new material to be released in the coming months.

Collaborative ventures (2018-present)

Bazm e Rang' (2019)
Bazm-e-Rang' is the brain child of Sarang Latif, son of Madam Abida Parveen, legendary Sufi singer, and a living Sufi herself. The main concept of the programme is to get artists from various genres and musical influences to give voice to Sufi kalam curated by Abida Jee and also set to music by her. Bazm-e-Rang has compositions by Abida jee from Kalams of legendary Sufi poets like Baba Bulleh Shah, Shah Niaz Barelvi, Bedam Shah Warsi, Amir Khusro and Shah Abdul Latif Bhittai.

While working with Madam Abida for 'Bazm e Rang' Khurram found her to be, "the true essence of a sufi soul in both her life and music. You feel at ease and peace just by sitting with her and conversing on life and music. This project called "Bazm e Rang" is an initiative by her son Sarang Latif and also features other artists. The promo has been released. My collaboration called" Ranjhay Bina" is a 15 min sojourn into mysticism and the love of Maula. I have learnt a lot at a spiritual level than a musical level while producing the track and playing in it."

kW & Nikhil (2018–present)
In 2018 Khurram collaborated with Dubai-based musician Nikhil Raj Uzgare who is the vocalist of the award-winning rock band, Point of View, based in Dubai. Their collaboration resulted in the soft ballad 'Baatein', ostensibly far removed from the progressive rock sound of Khurram's other ventures but executed with the same degree of passion and attention to detail.
The whole process was a unique experience, entailing cross geographical digital exchange of musical notes, long distance recordings and finally the in-person meeting in Dubai to shoot the video 'guerrilla style'. The Dubai meet culminated in a spontaneous acoustic gig before the video release. In the process, Khurram and Nikhil became good friends and are all set to release more songs in the near future.

With Taimur Khan and Sarfaraz Khan (2019)
Of late, Khurram has regularly contributed his guitar skills in jams featuring Taimur Khan on sarangi and Sarfaraz Khan on tabla, among the country's finest on their respective instruments. They have presented their own take on Raag Charukeshi, Raag Basant Mukhari, Raag Multani and Raag Bhairon as Facebook live sessions with many more collaborations in the pipeline.

Past ventures

Fantazia the Band (1992–96)
The first band Khurram ever featured in, was 'Fantazia' with school mates and good friends Suhaib Kiani, Taimur Khan and Sabih Zaman. The band performed covers as well as original music in several gigs performed around Rawalpindi and Islamabad.

In Lahore: Entity and kNuMb (1996–2001)
Lahore of the mid and late 1990s had a vibrant underground music culture and was referred to as a 'contemporary rock hub'. During this time Khurram was part of various rock bands that had a cult following. Initially he played a few gigs with Coven the band when their guitarist Hamza Jafri left for London. During this time he struck a lifelong friendship with Ali Noor, Ali Jafri and Abid Khan. 
Then came his stint with 'Entity' (later Entity Paradigm), featuring Ahmad Ali Butt, Qasim Khan and Salman Albert. 
Qasim and Khurram were to form kNuMb in late 90s. kNuMb played a mix of guitar instrumentals and original songs in gigs around the country. In 2001 Khurram left for the US to pursue his graduate studies.

In Pittsburgh (2000–02)
While in Pittsburgh, Pennsylvania in the United States to pursue his master's degree in Information Systems Management, Waqar formed an instrumental band 'Cocytus' with a group of fellow CMU students. The band was multicultural and multi-ethnic in nature, with Rodrigo Escobar, the bassist, hailing from Chile; Frank Boucamp, the rhythm guitarist, from Germany; and Ammar, the drummer, an American of Indian origin. Cocytus performed in and around the university and had a few gigs in local bars and discos. While in Pittsburgh, Waqar also participated in a nationwide talent hunt called Guitarmageddon, and made it to the Pittsburgh finals.

kNuMb (2003–08)
Upon his return from the US, kNuMb rebanded with Waqar on the lead guitars, Qasim on vocals, Faraz on bass, Abdul Ahad on rhythms and Sharjeel on drums, to be later replaced by Kami. At that time, music and arts in Pakistan were experiencing an unprecedented boom and the music scene was particularly vibrant. kNuMb performed concerts in Islamabad and Lahore. kNuMb's hallmark became their mixed set of instrumentals as well as originals like Anjaani Rahain, Lamhe and Majhi, while their covers of Audioslave were particularly well liked. Around this time a couple of Steve Vai-Joe Satriani inspired G3 concerts were arranged by fans, in which Waqar performed alongside eminent guitarists like Faraz Anwar, Sarmad Ghafoor and Zeejah Fazli.

Establishing the Rootgate Studio
In 2003, Khurram set up a home based music studio called the Root Gate Studio with the facility to record live drums. All of kNuMb's material, 70% of Qayaas' album Uss Paar and all of KW's recorded music since has been recorded there. Despite state of the art equipment, the studio is meant only for personal jams and recordings.

Qayaas (2008–2014)
In 2008, Khurram formed the rock band Qayaas with Umair Jaswal on vocals which, over the years, developed a cult following. The band received Best Rock Band (Pakistan) award at the 2010 Rolling Stone-Jack Daniel's annual rock awards including Best Rock Band (Pakistan). They also won big at IndieGO, held in Malaysia in 2012. In the same year, their song "Charkha Naulakha" featured in Coke Studio Pakistan. The song also featured in a special limited-edition CD of 'Coke Studio's Greatest Hits' and currently has more than four million views on YouTube.

Their debut album, Uss Paar, featuring 13 original songs, was released in 2011 to immense critical acclaim. In 2013 the band also contributed three songs to the soundtrack of Waar, the highest grossing Pakistani film at the time. Qayaas also composed the single "Vadero Pajero" for the award-winning animated show Burka Avengers.

In 2014 the band parted ways.

Awards and recognition
2010: "Mera wana" was selected as part of the Metal Asia Compilation of work by rock and metal bands from Lebanon to Singapore.
2010: Qayaas was winner of the Best Rock Band (Pakistan) award by Rolling Stone magazine India in collaboration with Jack Daniels. The band was chosen from amongst 25+ nominations from Pakistan.
2011: Qayaas won in the following categories at INDIEGO awards
Best Rock Song
Best Rock Video
Best Rock Vocalist
2018: 'Todi the Smoker' won Rock Song of the Year 2018 at VIMA Music awards with kW & The Facedown Movement.

References

External links
kW
kW and The Facedown Movement
Qayaas
Knumb

Pakistani guitarists
Living people
People from Islamabad
1975 births
Pakistani heavy metal guitarists
Pakistani rock guitarists